The Hunt-Moore House is a historic house in Huntland, Tennessee, U.S..

History
The house was built in 1852 by slaves for Clinton Armstrong Hunt and his wife, Tapheneas Cooke Lipscomb. Hunt's grandfather, John Hunt, was the namesake of Huntsville, Alabama, and his nephew, David Lipscomb, was the Nashville Bible School, later known as Lipscomb University.

The house was inherited by Hunt's daughter Anne and her husband, Horatio Richardson Moore. During the American Civil War of 1861–1865, Moore served in the Confederate States Army. He served in the Tennessee General Assembly from 1873 to 1875. One of their children, Hugh Benton Moore, and his wife Helen Edmunds Moore, developed Texas City, Texas, where he built the Col. Hugh B. and Helen Moore House, listed on the NRHP. The Hunt-Moore House was inherited by their other children.

The house has been listed on the National Register of Historic Places since November 9, 2005.

References

National Register of Historic Places in Franklin County, Tennessee
Federal architecture in Tennessee
Greek Revival architecture in Tennessee
Houses completed in 1852